Gay is an unincorporated community in Jackson County, North Carolina,  United States.

History
A post office was established at Gay in 1907, and remained in operation until it was discontinued in 1953. The community has the name of Gay Sutton, a pioneer citizen.

References

Unincorporated communities in Jackson County, North Carolina
Unincorporated communities in North Carolina